Chunkappara is a small town in the Pathanamthitta district of Kerala state, South India. Other neighbouring towns include Kanjirapally, Ranny, and Erumely.

Chunkappara is in the middle of a hilly region, with springs flowing throughout.  The place is believed to have been located in the midst of Ponthanpuzha forest centuries ago.  It is the only independent place where people have access without discrimination regarding caste, creed, colour, religion, age or sex.

Etymology
It is believed Chunkappara had a forest path and there was a check post erected here to collect taxes. The tax collectors used to sit beneath a huge rock, which is how the name Chunkappara developed ("Chunkam" means "tax" and "Para" means "rock"). This tax collecting spot is near to St. George high school.but now chunkapara town is centered in previous ozhapukuzhi kavala the place 3 roads joins. Elderly say that the place will one day become Kanakappara ("Golden Rock").
Even though there is speculation of ancient artefacts like "neelakoduveli", they are said to be a mystery even after centuries of speculation.

Economy
Chunkappara is a developing town of the Kottangal Panchayat in Mallapally Thaluk. This is a business centre of  people who lives in Perumbetty, Chalapally, Kulathoor, Alapara, Kottangal area. There are many Gulf returnees and successful businessmen in the area.

Schools
One of the oldest schools is St. George High School, Kottangal. It keeps academic standards up to 10. C.M.S. L.P. School is another old educational institution in Kottangal Panchayat. There is also an English middle school called Christu Raja English Medium School, and public school (CBSE High School) which are run by the Malankara Catholic Church. Kottangal L>P school is another old educational institution in Kottangal Panchayathu, close by Kottangal Kurishu Kavala.

Nearby villages
Nearby villages include Kottangal, Perumpetty, Alapra, Manimala, Ponthanpuzha, Ranni, Erumeli, Vaipur, Ezhumatoor, and Chalapally. Chunkappara is in the middle of a hilly region, with springs flowing throughout. The place is believed to have been located in the midst of Ponthanpuzha forest centuries ago.

Demographics
It is an independent place where people have access without discrimination regarding caste, creed, colour, religion, age or sex.

Transport
The main roads passing through

Distance between Chunkappara and nearby towns:

Manimala - 8 km
Mallapally - 14 km
Ranni - 14 km
Erumely - 15 km
Kozhenchery - 18 km
Kanjirappally - 21 km
Ponkunnam - 22 km
Chengannur - 24 km
Thiruvalla - 26 km
Pathanamthitta - 29 km
Changanassery - 30 km
Kottayam - 35 km
Palai - 45 km
Kochi - 110 km.

Chunkappara is well connected by private and KSRTC buses. Thiruvalla, Mallapally, Ponkunnam, Pathanamthitta, and Chengannur KSRTC  depots operates services from Chunkappara. Chunkappara bus stand is in the centre of Chunkappara town. It is the largest bus stand in Mallappally Taluk. KSRTC operates Chunkappara-Mallapally-Thiruvalla chain service from Chunkappara.

Hospitals

1. Shareena Medical Centre,
Ponthanpuzha road, Chunkappara

2. V care hospital highschool  Road, Chunkkapara

3. Government Hospital, 
Thundiapara Junction, Kadikavu Road, Chunkappara

3. Government Homeo Hospital,
Thiruvalla Road, Chunkappara

Places for worship
The famous Kottangal devi temple is just 2.5 km from Chunkappara town. The temple is famous for Padayani Maholsavam, where people from many parts of the state gathers, it is the festival which involves many art forms and many traditional beliefs. There are lot of churches in Chunkappara. Little flower church, St. George Malankara church, Marthoma church, India Pentecostal Church of God, The Pentecostal Mission,  Alaprakadu church and Kottangal church. Chunkappara Juma masjid lies opposite to Chunkappara bus stand. Kottangal Jumah Masjid, also known as Vettukallummuri Jumah Masjid is just 2 km far from Chunkappara town Perumpetty Mahadeva temple is just 2 km from Chunkappara. Alapra Jumah Masjid also known as Urumbath Palli is also 2 km distant from Chunkappara. 
People in Chunkappara never discriminates each other in the name of religion. They will be together in every festivals held. They tries to bring unity in every things they do.

Education institutions
 St. George HS
 CMS LPS
 Alaprakkad govt Lps
 Kottangal govt Lps
 Al Hind public school
 St. Joseph Hs, Kulathoor
 Assisi Center, For mentally retarded Children.
 Christu Raja English Medium School
 Christhuraja public school

Communication
BSNL set up a telephone exchange at Chunkappara in 1995. All major mobile operators including BSNL, Idea, Vodafone, Airtel, Tata docomo, Virgin, and Reliance have sufficient network in Chunkapara. BSNL started internet service at Chunkapara in 2000. Now broadband is available all over town. Now Chunkappara is communicationally developed town.

Business Enterprises
Amity Rocks Pvt Ltd is a quarry company 1.5 km distant from Chunkappara which deals with rock and rock products all over Kerala and it is one of South India's largest Quarry Company. Established in 2006 and has widely expanded all over kerala during this short period. Amity Rocks provides many job opportunities to the people from other states in India. There seems to be lot of political involvement and support for this project otherwise such a project would not have been possible to operate with in 100 meters from the forest boundaries. It is also said that Amity is doing harm to the environment by breaking the beautiful rocks and hills in Chunkappara.

Other Business in Chunkappara - Mannil hyper market(MBC), Cherupushpam Agencies, kurians fuel, Goodwill Enterprises (White Mart Showroom), Vazhakkalayil Jewellers, Chinnu's Electricals and Sanitary, Kottemannil Stores, Kottemannil Textiles, Sajan Bakery, Alain Bakery, Fathima Sweets, Mannil service center and paintings, Alfair Stores, Hanna Mobiles, Maria Electricals, National Electricals, Al Ameen Fruits Corner, Fresh Corner Vegetable Stall, Premier Electronics, Eenam Electronics, Makkah Centre, Alshifa Shopping Centre, Sona Jewellers, jesus fisheries, Soji Studio, Ottaplackal Agencies, Sahara Agencies, Super Men's wear, Rawther textiles, Lavender Textiles, kochin foods. National Textiles, Asha Textiles, Channel Communications, Panamthottam Agencies, Plathottam Agencies, CK Fisheries, CKK Fisheries, Mobile Zone and many other stores are there in Chunkappara. Chunkappara is a place where heavy sale happens every day. All the business in Chunkappara is a success.

Places to visit
Orakkanpara is a beautiful waterfall in Chunkappara. Nagappara is historical place in Chunkappara inside a dense forest. There is a beautiful waterfall in Nagappara and a lot of forest springs are flowing through Nagappara. Nagappara is just 2 km from Chunkappara. Oottupara is another important tourist spot in Chunkappara. From Oottupara we can see beautiful sunset. It is just 2.5 km from Chunkappara. If government will concern about  a tourism development in Chunkappara connected with Ootupara, Nagappara, Orakkanpara, it will boost the development of Chunkappara town. Karuvallikad is a pilgrim centre for Christians and Puliyurumbu is a pilgrim destination for prds community.

References 

Villages in Pathanamthitta district